Alexei Aleksandrovich Vasilchenko (born 29 March 1981) is a Kazakhstani former ice hockey defenceman. Vassilchenko previously played in the  Russian Superleague for Metallurg Novokuznetsk, HC Spartak Moscow, Salavat Yulaev Ufa, HC Neftekhimik Nizhnekamsk, HC CSKA Moscow and HC MVD. In 2008, he joined Barys Astana for the newly formed Kontinental Hockey League (KHL). He played parts of nine seasons in the KHL between 2008 and 2017.

International career
Vasilchenko is a veteran member of the Kazakhstan men's national ice hockey team who has participated at the Ice Hockey World Championships in 2001, 2002, 2005, 2010, and 2011.

He also competed with the Kazakhstan team at the 2006 Winter Olympics.

Career statistics

Regular season and playoffs

International

References

External links

1981 births
Living people
Barys Nur-Sultan players
HC CSKA Moscow players
Metallurg Novokuznetsk players
HC MVD players
HC Neftekhimik Nizhnekamsk players
HC Spartak Moscow players
Kazakhstani ice hockey defencemen
Ice hockey players at the 2006 Winter Olympics
Olympic ice hockey players of Kazakhstan
Sportspeople from Oskemen
Salavat Yulaev Ufa players
Traktor Chelyabinsk players
HC Yugra players
Asian Games gold medalists for Kazakhstan
Medalists at the 2011 Asian Winter Games
Asian Games medalists in ice hockey
Ice hockey players at the 2011 Asian Winter Games